Yesterday & Today Volume 3 is a compilation album by the progressive bluegrass band Country Gentlemen.

Track listing

 Train 45, White Rose (Traditional)
 Pretty Polly (Traditional)
 Silence Of Tears
 Pallet On The Floor (Traditional)
 Hank Snow Medley
 Galveston Flood
 These Men Of God
 Sunrise (Ernest Seitz, Eugene Lockhart)
 They Call The Wind Maria (Alan Jay Lerner, Frederick Loewe) 
 Heaven

Personnel
 Charlie Waller - guitar, vocals
 Doyle Lawson - mandolin, vocals
 Bill Emerson - banjo, vocals
 Bill Yates - bass, vocals

References

The Country Gentlemen compilation albums
1974 compilation albums
Rebel Records compilation albums